The soundtrack album of the third season of HBO series Game of Thrones, titled Game of Thrones: Season 3, was released digitally on June 4, 2013, and on CD on July 2, 2013. The album was composed by Ramin Djawadi.

Reception
The soundtrack received positive reviews from critics.

Track listing

Credits and personnel
Personnel adapted from the album liner notes.

 David Benioff – liner notes
 Ramin Djawadi – composer, primary artist, producer
 The Hold Steady – band, primary artist 

 George R.R. Martin – lyricist
 Kerry Ingram – primary artist 
 D.B. Weiss – liner notes

Charts

Awards and nominations

References

Ramin Djawadi soundtracks
2013 soundtrack albums
Soundtrack
Classical music soundtracks
Instrumental soundtracks
Television soundtracks
WaterTower Music soundtracks